Axiocerses tjoane, the eastern scarlet, common scarlet or scarlet butterfly, is a butterfly of the family Lycaenidae. It is found in East and southern Africa.

Description and habits
The wingspan is 24–32 mm for males and 25–34 mm for females. Adults are on the wing year-round.

The larvae feed on Acacia (including A. abyssinica, A. polyacantha subsp. campylacantha and A. sieberiana var. woodii), Peltophorum africanum and Brachystegia species (all legumes).

Subspecies
Axiocerses tjoane tjoane
Range: Kenya, Tanzania, Malawi, central and eastern Zambia, Angola, Zimbabwe, Mozambique, Namibia, Botswana, Eswatini and South Africa: Limpopo, Mpumalanga, North West, Gauteng, KwaZulu-Natal and Eastern Cape provinces
Axiocerses tjoane rubescens Henning & Henning, 1996
Range: south-eastern DRC to north-western Zambia

Gallery

References

External links
Axiocerses tjoane tjoane at Flora of Zimbabwe

Butterflies described in 1857
Axiocerses